The Matra Murena is a mid-engined, rear wheel drive sports car that was produced from 1980 through 1983 by the French engineering group Matra. The factory was located in the commune of Romorantin-Lanthenay in the department of Loir-et-Cher in central France.

Development history 
The Murena, whose name is Italian for "Moray", was the successor to the Matra Bagheera, a similar vehicle that resulted from an earlier collaboration between Matra and Simca. Development proceeded under two project names; "M551" for the 1.6-litre version and "M552" for the 2.2-litre version. The prototype received designation P-551 and was accompanied by a series of mockups. The Murena inherited the Bagheera's mid-engined layout and hatchback body shape, but substantial changes were made to address some of the problems with the previous model, among which were a lack of power, absence of a 5-speed transmission option, and a chassis extremely prone to rust. Engineering of the car was done entirely by Matra. Greek industrial designer Antonis Volanis, who had contributed to the interior of the earlier Bagheera and been principal designer for the Matra Rancho, headed up the design.

The Murena drew heavily from the corporate parts bin, using engines from the Talbot Solara and Talbot Tagora, a transaxle from the Citroën CX, tail light clusters (but with custom lenses), steering rack and front suspension from the Talbot Horizon, front indicator and running lights from the Renault 12, and door handles from the Peugeot 505.

Chassis 
The Murena's chassis was similar to the Bagheera's although it was a new design. In appearance it was very close to a full unitary body. The chassis did differ from the Bagheera's in two significant ways. One was that the rear cradle was reconfigured to accommodate a new rear suspension system. The second change was that the entire chassis was galvanised to prevent the Murena from falling victim to the rust problems that plagued the Bagheera. The Murena was actually the first production car to use galvanised steel for all chassis parts.

The car was only built in a left hand drive configuration, although a small number of right hand drive conversions were done by Wooler-Hodec.

Bodywork 

Even though it used a chassis very similar in principle to the Bagheera and the same basic body-style, the styling for the Murena was all-new. The final shape was extremely aerodynamic for the time, with a reported drag coefficient of 0.328. The rear hatch opened to provide access to the engine mounted behind the passenger compartment and a rear luggage area. A signature feature carried over from the previous model was the seating arrangement - all three seats were placed in one row, with the middle seat folding down to become an armrest when not in use by a passenger. In the Murena the three seats were separate, in contrast to the 2+1 arrangement in the Bagheera.

The car's twelve major body panels were made of fibreglass-epoxy. According to Matra's general manager, Jean-Louis Caussin, these body panels were produced using a manufacturing process known as the "sheet moulding compound" moulding process. The new galvanised chassis coupled with the composite panels made the car essentially immune to rust, except for the rear suspension's trailing arms.

Over its production life the car was offered in a range of ten colours; platinum metallic, white neve, coral metallic, green Hudson, bordeau, red mephisto, titanium gray, cinnamon metallic, yellow mimosa, and blue Colombia.

Suspension 
The front suspension was similar to the Bagheera's, while the rear suspension was a departure from the Murena's predecessor. In the tradition of the Simca 1100, Talbot Alpine, and Talbot Horizon, at the front were upper and lower transverse A-arms with longitudinal torsion bars and telescopic hydraulic shock-absorbers. An anti-roll bar was also fitted. At the rear, the Bagheera's torsion bar suspension was replaced by semi-trailing arms with coil springs mounted on telescopic hydraulic shock absorbers. An anti-roll bar was also fitted at the rear.

Powertrain 
Two engines were offered. The base model had a 1.6-litre Poissy engine, while the more powerful version came with a 2.2-litre Type 180. This kit was initially a dealer-installed option, but the last 480 Murenas came with this uprated engine directly from the factory. This version was called the Murena S. The standard 2.2-litre engine used a single Solex down-draught carburetor, but S models had twin side-draught Solex carburetors.

The Murena received a 5-speed manual transaxle derived from that of the Citroën CX. Different models of Murena used different final-drive ratios but all Murenas used the same transaxle.

Driving impressions 
In the May 1981 issue of Car magazine automotive journalist LJK Setright, in an article titled "Murena the marvellous", described the Murena as being "endowed with a suspension so superb that it need never go slowly". He also wrote that, although not a sprinter, when it came to sustaining high speeds on winding roads "the Murena ranks high - better than the basic Porsche 924, every bit as good as the Lancia Monte Carlo, and losing only in sheer agility to the Fiat X1/9, while it shows up the Porsche 911 as ill-balanced and inept" and went on write that this "is one of the most sweetly responsive cars that ever offered a driver a choice of how to steer through a bend." In the end he felt that the car would benefit from more power.

Model year changes 
 1981: Murena 1.6 model debuts, followed shortly by the 2.2 model.
 1982: The "Préparation 142" option is offered for the 2.2-litre engine. It is installed by Talbot dealers.
 1983: The 1.6 and 2.2 models are carried forward without significant changes.
 1984: The 1.6 and 2.2 models are discontinued. The Murena S is the only version offered in model year 1984.

Production numbers 
Production of the 1981 model-year Murena 1.6 began in November 1980, followed a few months later by the 2.2. Production of the Matra Murena ended in July 1983, when the Matra factory switched over to building the first generation of Renault Espace minivan.

 Murena 1.6: 5,640 units.
 Murena 2.2: 4,560 units.
 Murena S: 480 units.
 Total production: 10,680 units.

Prototypes and specials 
 A project to develop a 16-valve cylinder head for the 2.2-litre block resulted in the "4S" ("quatre soupapes", or "four valves") prototype. The 4S also received wider wheel arches and deeper spoilers at the front and rear.
 A Murena was modified to accommodate a Matra 3-litre MS81 model Formula 1 V12 longitudinally in the chassis.
 Matra developed its own modified Murenas for Group 4. These cars used a version of the engine prepared by the Racing Division of Chrysler (ROC), came with all wheel-drive, and were called the Matra Murena 4WD.
 With the participation of racing driver Jean-Pierre Beltoise the Politecnic company developed kits and engines to adapt the Murena for racing and also produced a customized version of the Murena called the Matra-Politecnic-Beltoise. This car had custom bodywork, a modified interior and came with a Group 4 engine that produced 184 horsepower.
 A body-conversion kit was developed for the Murena by Saier of Germany that gave the car the appearance of a BMW M1. BMW successfully sued the producers of the kit.
 French coachbuilder Henri Chapron displayed a Murena with a removable roof panel at the 1982 Paris Motor Show. The car was called the Murena Chapron Chimère.

Murenas in racing 
A Murena prepared for Group 4 by Politecnic was entered in the 1981 1000 Pistas (laps) Rally. The car was driven by Jean-Pierre Beltoise and the co-driver was singer Véronique Jannot. The car retired early, due to failed engine mounting.

Race-tuned Murenas prepared by Politecnic produced the following results:
3 French Rallycross championship titles
1 European Champion title (2nd division)
1 French Mountain Cup championship

Drivers included Jean-Pierre Beltoise, Max Mamers, Rémy Julienne, Jean-Pierre Jaussaud, Johnny Servoz-Gavin, Jean-Claude Andruet and Philippe Wambergue.

Gallery

References

Further reading 
 Talbot Matra Murena : La dévoreuse de bitume by André Dewael. Editions Techniques pour l'Automobile et l'Industrie, April 28, 2012.

External links

Matra Club UK
International Murena Register
Matra Club Portugal

Cars introduced in 1980
Murena
Mid-engined cars
Rear mid-engine, rear-wheel-drive vehicles
Matra Bagheera
Group 4 (racing) cars
Sports cars
Cars discontinued in 1983